Nikephoros Euphorbenos Katakalon was a Byzantine aristocrat and son-in-law of Emperor Alexios I Komnenos.

He was the son of the distinguished general Constantine Euphorbenos Katakalon, one of Alexios' most trusted officials. As a token of Alexios' appreciation for Constantine, Nikephoros was married to the porphyrogennete Maria, the emperor's second daughter, and raised to the rank of panhypersebastos. From the Alexiad, he is known to have participated in combat against the Cumans in 1095, alongside his father, where he distinguished himself by his bravery. It is unknown when he died, but he is recorded as being dead by 1130.

With Maria, he had numerous children, but only two sons, Alexios Komnenos and Andronikos, are known by name, having held senior positions later in the century. Another son, John, is known only by his commemoration in the typikon of the Monastery of Christ Philanthropos. The couple also had an unknown number of daughters (at least three according to Varzos), as their existence is mentioned in the typikon of the Kecharitomene Monastery.

References

Sources 
 
 
 

12th-century deaths
11th-century Byzantine people
12th-century Byzantine people
Family of Alexios I Komnenos
Nikephoros
Year of birth unknown
Panhypersebastoi
Euphorbenos family